Aubletiana is a plant genus of the family Euphorbiaceae, first described as a genus in 2000. It is native to tropical Africa.

Species
 Aubletiana leptostachys (Breteler) J.Murillo - Cameroon, Gabon
 Aubletiana macrostachys (Breteler) J.Murillo - Gabon

References

Alchorneae
Euphorbiaceae genera